The Armory may refer to:

 The Armory (San Francisco)
 The Armory (Key West), Florida, listed on the NRHP in Florida
 The Armory (Portland, Oregon)
 The Armory Show (art fair)
 The 69th Regiment Armory, in New York City, site of the show
 The Armory (Janesville, Wisconsin), listed on the National Register of Historic Places in Rock County, Wisconsin
 The Armory (game company), a US distributor of tabletop games and supplies, now part of Alliance Distribution.
 The Citadel Armory, Charleston, South Carolina, currently known as McAlister Field House and home of The Citadel Bulldogs basketball, wrestling, and volleyball teams.
 Fort Washington Avenue Armory, home of the New Balance Track and Field Center in Washington Heights, New York
 Minneapolis Armory, in downtown Minneapolis, Minnesota, known locally as The Armory, and listed on the U.S. National Register of Historic Places in 1985.
 Washington Avenue Armory, in Albany, New York.